Between the Buried and Me, often abbreviated as BTBAM, is an American progressive metal band from Raleigh, North Carolina. Formed in 2000, the band consists of Tommy Giles Rogers Jr. (lead vocals, keyboards), Paul Waggoner (lead guitar, backing vocals), Dustie Waring (rhythm guitar, lead guitar), Dan Briggs (bass, keyboards), and Blake Richardson (drums).

Their debut eponymous album was released through Lifeforce Records in 2002, shifting to Victory Records for subsequent releases until their signing to Metal Blade in 2011, where Between the Buried and Me released their first extended play, The Parallax: Hypersleep Dialogues that year, and its full-length follow-up The Parallax II: Future Sequence the following year. Their seventh studio album, Coma Ecliptic, was released in July 2015. Their eighth album Automata I was released in March 2018, and their ninth album, Automata II, was released in July 2018. Their tenth album, Colors II (a follow up to 2007's Colors), was released in August 2021.

History

Formation and eponymous album (2000–2002)
The band was formed in 2000 in Raleigh, North Carolina after the demise of the metalcore bands From Here On and Prayer for Cleansing, of which Rogers, Waggoner, and Goodyear were members. Nick Fletcher and Jason King subsequently joined on guitar and bass respectively. The name "Between the Buried and Me" was chosen after a section of lyrics in the Counting Crows song "Ghost Train".

Between the Buried and Me's first release was a demo containing three songs, all of which were re-recorded for the band's self-titled debut album, released through Lifeforce Records in 2002.  The song "Aspirations" became the band's first music video. The album was not initially successful but did manage to catch the attention of Victory Records, to which they later signed. Victory reissued the album in 2004 as an enhanced CD. The band toured in support of their first album with Canadian metalcore group The End.

The Silent Circus, Alaska, and The Anatomy Of (2003–2006)
In August 2003, Between the Buried and Me traveled to Q Division Studios in Somerville, Massachusetts to record their second record, The Silent Circus, released in October the same year. It was later re-released in 2006 with a live DVD of the band's performance at The Cat's Cradle in Chapel Hill, North Carolina on July 17, 2005. Mark Castillo played drums on The Silent Circus, replacing Goodyear.

After the release of The Silent Circus, the band went through numerous members before the current lineup was assembled for their third album, Alaska. On drums, Mark Castillo was replaced by Jason Roe, and later by Blake Richardson. On guitar, Fletcher was replaced by Shane Blay, and later by Dustie Waring. And on bass, King was replaced by Kevin Falk, and later by Dan Briggs. This remains the current lineup.

In September 2005, Between the Buried and Me released Alaska. The album released the songs "Selkies: The Endless Obsession", "The Primer", and "Backwards Marathon" as singles. In the following year, the band released their first cover album, The Anatomy Of, a collection of covers of bands that influenced them, including Metallica, King Crimson, Pantera, Faith No More, Queen, Pink Floyd, Earth Crisis, Counting Crows, and Soundgarden.
In early 2006, Between the Buried and Me was on tour supporting Bleeding Through along with Every Time I Die and Haste the Day. They were also on the Ozzfest 2006 Second Stage. In late 2006, they were on the Radio Rebellion Tour headlined by Norma Jean.

Colors and The Great Misdirect (2007–2009)
In September 2007, Between the Buried and Me released their fourth studio album (fifth if including The Anatomy Of), Colors. Band members called it "a 65 minute opus of non stop pummeling beautiful music... we have described this release as 'new wave polka grunge'." The band also described the album as "adult contemporary progressive death metal".

In September 2007, after the release of Colors, the band went on tour with Animosity and Horse the Band. Giant (now known as BraveYoung) also supported their shows in the US. The run concluded with their November 4 appearance at the Saints and Sinners Fest in Asbury Park, New Jersey. In December 2007, they again embarked on a headlining tour, supported by August Burns Red and Behold... The Arctopus. The band were also the main support on The Dillinger Escape Plan's 2008 UK tour. Between the Buried and Me were one of the acts that took part at "Progressive Nation '08", the first in what became an annual progressive music festival, also featuring Dream Theater, Opeth, and 3.

Starting in summer 2008 and continuing in the fall, they performed as a supporting act for Children of Bodom's US headlining tour, alongside The Black Dahlia Murder. In early December 2008, they went on a short four-show tour around the Carolinas and Georgia (US) with other bands from the Carolinas, such as He Is Legend, Advent, and Nightbear. Between the Buried and Me finished a month-long tour of Australia on January 9 with headliners Bleeding Through, As Blood Runs Black, In Trenches, and The Abandonment. In September 2009, Between the Buried and Me performed a Canadian Tour with Killswitch Engage and In Flames co-headlining, along with the support of Protest the Hero.

On May 31, 2009, the group went into the studio to record their fifth album (sixth if including The Anatomy Of), The Great Misdirect. They released the single "Obfuscation" on September 29 and the album on October 27.

The Parallax and Metal Blade Records (2010–2014)
In February 2010, Between the Buried and Me supported Mastodon along with Baroness on their US headlining tour. During the summer of 2010, they were on the Cool Tour with As I Lay Dying, Underoath, War of Ages, The Acacia Strain, Architects, Cancer Bats, and Blessthefall.

In early 2010, Between the Buried and Me toured across North America with Cynic, Devin Townsend, and Scale the Summit. Afterwards, they traveled to Europe supporting Lamb of God, along with Job for a Cowboy and August Burns Red.

In February 2011, Between the Buried and Me were confirmed to play at the New England Metal & Hardcore Festival on Saturday, April 16 in Worcester, MA. They were main support for Hatebreed. In April and May 2011 they headlined a tour featuring Job for a Cowboy, The Ocean, and on select dates Cephalic Carnage.

Between the Buried and Me stated their move from Victory to Metal Blade Records and quickly released an EP entitled The Parallax: Hypersleep Dialogues on April 12, 2011. In May, Victory Records announced the release of a greatest hits album as a three-disc set. On January 16, 2012, Between the Buried and Me revealed that work on the full-length second part to The Parallax had begun and was later released as The Parallax II: Future Sequence on October 9, 2012.

Between the Buried and Me also announced a headlining European tour beginning in Paris on September 2, 2011, and continuing throughout the mainland and into the UK, ending up in Moscow on September 30. The tour was supported by Animals as Leaders. In July 2011, the band announced their headlining North American "Saints&Sinners Tour" playing throughout November and December with Animals as Leaders and TesseracT. The band created a few medleys just for this tour, and performed songs that they hadn't played in years. They co-headlined the 2012 Summer Slaughter under Cannibal Corpse with numerous other metal bands such as Exhumed, Job for a Cowboy, The Faceless, and Veil of Maya, followed by a co-headlining tour through Europe and UK with Periphery and The Safety Fire.

They also toured Japan and Australia with Animals as Leaders in November 2012.

Starting in February 2013, they toured with Coheed and Cambria.

In fall 2013 they embarked on The Future Sequence Tour, where they played The Parallax II: Future Sequence all the way through. Support was provided by The Faceless, The Contortionist, and The Safety Fire.

On February 14, 2014, it was announced Between the Buried and Me would record and release a live album for The Parallax II: Future Sequence, playing it in its entirety with additional instruments, including a saxophone, percussionists, flute, and a string quartet. The release, titled Future Sequence: Live at the Fidelitorium, was released September 30, 2014.

Coma Ecliptic and Colors 10th Anniversary Tour (2015–2017)
On March 17, 2015, they announced that Coma Ecliptic would be released through Metal Blade Records on July 7, 2015, and released a song titled "Memory Palace" on July 10.

From 2015 - 2017, Between the Buried and Me went out on their Coma Ecliptic World Tour and headlined with / co-headlined for August Burns Red, Animals as Leaders, Devin Townsend Project, Fallujah, Enslaved, and The Contortionist.

The band released "Coma Ecliptic: Live" on April 28, 2017, which has their entire Coma Ecliptic album played live in its entirety.

In the fall of 2017,  Between the Buried and Me toured for the Colors 10th Anniversary Tour where they performed the whole album.

Automata and Sumerian Records (2018–2019)

Recording of the band's upcoming eighth full-length album began on July 31, 2017 and finished on September 6, with the release date scheduled in early 2018.

On December 28, 2017, bassist Dan Briggs posted footage of a song they had finished recording separate from the eighth studio album completed in September 2017. It was later revealed to be their interpretation of The Dear Hunter's track "The Tank" for an exclusive 7-inch split with the band.

In January 2018, the band announced Automata, a two-part studio album. Automata I was announced a release date of March 9, 2018, via Sumerian Records. The second part, Automata II, was released on July 13, 2018.

Their "Between the Buried and Me Spring 2018 Tour" was announced as well, spanning March 2 to April 7, 2018, across the contiguous United States. The tour would be supported by The Dear Hunter with special guests Leprous. Additionally, it was announced on the Thomas Giles Instagram how their exclusive split 7-inch single with The Dear Hunter would be available for VIP package buyers on the tour. The split 7-inch would contain each band recording their interpretation of an existing song from the other band.
 
The band then headlined the entire 2018 portion of the Summer Slaughter tour. They were joined up with bands such as Born of Osiris, Veil of Maya, ERRA, The Agony Scene, Allegaeon, Terror Universal, Soreption, and Entheos.

In early 2019, they toured Automata II in the US beginning in February and ending in March. Opening acts were Astronoid and TesseracT, except for a few dates.

Postponed 20th anniversary tour and Colors II (2020–present)
In spring 2020, the band was set to headline a 20th anniversary tour across North America, with the first set composed of songs spanning their career and the second set being The Great Misdirect performed in its entirety. Due to the COVID-19 pandemic, the band postponed the tour until it was safe to tour again. The tour was rebranded as a 21st anniversary tour in 2021 and kicked off in Atlanta on August 3 of that year.

The band revealed on November 16, 2020, that they have been writing their upcoming tenth studio album and are recording it for a scheduled release sometime in 2021.

On June 24, 2021, the band announced the release of their new album Colors II (follow-up to 2007's Colors) through SiriusXM's Liquid Metal channel. The album was released on August 20, 2021. The album's first single, "Fix the Error", was released online on June 25, 2021, along with a music video on July 7.

Musical style and influences 
Between the Buried and Me's general musical style has been stated by critics to be primarily a blend of progressive metal, technical death metal, progressive metalcore, avant-garde metal, and metalcore along with various musical styles: "One minute the band may be playing thrash metal and the next they're flowing into death metal growls and thick guitar riffs... the metal take on things can seemingly change in a flash as lead singer Tommy Rogers fleshes out his vocals and utilizes the keyboards to create something that sounds more like it should be on a Smashing Pumpkins album".

On the band's cover album, The Anatomy Of, the band pays tribute to many of their diverse influences, including Sepultura, Metallica, Blind Melon, Mötley Crüe, Queen, King Crimson, Soundgarden, Faith No More, Pantera, Pink Floyd, Depeche Mode, Earth Crisis, and The Smashing Pumpkins.

Band members

Current members
 Tommy Giles Rogers – lead vocals, keyboards (2000–present)
 Paul Waggoner – lead guitar, backing vocals, additional lead vocals (2000–present)
 Dustie Waring – rhythm guitar, additional lead guitar (2005–present)
 Dan Briggs – bass (2005–present), keyboards (2011–present), backing vocals (2005–2008)
 Blake Richardson – drums (2005–present) backing vocals, additional lead vocals (2018–present)

Former members
 Jason Schofield King – bass (2000–2004)
 Will Goodyear – drums, clean vocals (2000–2002)
 Marc Duncan – rhythm guitar (2000)
 Nicholas Shawn Fletcher – rhythm guitar (2000–2003)
 Michael Howard Reig – drums (2002–2003)
 Mark Castillo – drums (2003–2004)
 Shane Blay – rhythm guitar (2004)
 Jason Roe – drums (2004-2005)
 Kevin Falk – bass (2004–2005)

Timeline

Discography

Studio albums
 Between the Buried and Me (2002)
 The Silent Circus (2003)
 Alaska (2005)
 Colors (2007)
 The Great Misdirect (2009)
 The Parallax II: Future Sequence (2012)
 Coma Ecliptic (2015)
 Automata I (2018)
 Automata II (2018)
 Colors II (2021)

Other
 The Anatomy Of (cover album, 2006)
 The Parallax: Hypersleep Dialogues (EP, 2011)

Other projects
 Tommy Giles Rogers has an electronica side project named Giles. A music video for the song "Slumber Party" is featured on the DVD that is included on the re-release for Between the Buried and Me's second album The Silent Circus. Rogers also released a solo album on February 1, 2011, entitled Pulse. The album is credited under the name Thomas Giles. Also, under the name Thomas Giles, he released "Modern Noise" in November 2014 and "Velcro Kid" in November 2016. In 2018 he released the album Don't Touch the Outside.
 Dustie Waring and Blake Richardson are members of the deathcore band Glass Casket.
 Rogers and Jacob Troth run a clothing line named Jacob Rogers.
 Dan Briggs and members of Fear Before and Abigail Williams are members of an experimental supergroup named Orbs.

 Shane Blay is now in the bands Oh, Sleeper and Wovenwar and was formerly in the band Evelynn.
 Dan Briggs, along with Walter Fancourt (Casual Curious, Brand New Life) and Matt Lynch (Eyris) are members of a progressive rock/jazz fusion band named Trioscapes who are also signed under Metal Blade Records. As of 2020, they have released two albums. In 2012 they released their debut album Separate Realities, followed by Digital Dream Sequence in 2014.
 Dan Briggs, along with Richard Henshall (Haken), Matt Lynch, and Pete Jones, are in a supergroup, Nova Collective, which has released one instrumental jazz fusion album, The Further Side.
 Dan Briggs has an experimental solo project called Nightmare Scenario and released his debut EP Beyond What Is Real in 2019.
 Jason Roe is now in Society's Finest and formerly was in Evelynn.

References

External links
 

Heavy metal musical groups from North Carolina
American progressive metal musical groups
Metalcore musical groups from North Carolina
American mathcore musical groups
American death metal musical groups
American technical death metal musical groups
Musical groups established in 2000
Victory Records artists
Metal Blade Records artists
Sumerian Records artists
Musical quintets
Musical groups from North Carolina
Musical groups from Raleigh, North Carolina